Tariel Bitsadze is a Georgian karateka and mixed martial artist. He competed in the Heavyweight and Super heavyweight division. He is a former RINGS Openweight Champion.

Mixed martial arts career
A former 1991 World Open Karate Championship finalist who was eliminated by Andy Hug, Bitsadze trained for his mixed martial arts debut in his Fighting Network RINGS's RINGS Georgia team, taking in both editions of the King of Kings tournament. He was pitted against RINGS Holland exponent Gilbert Yvel at the first one, but he was taken down and submitted via armbar, thus being eliminated from the league. Tariel performed better at the next edition, threatening Renato Sobral with a close guillotine choke attempt, but being eventually caught in an armbar again and eliminated.

Mixed martial arts record

|-
| Loss
| align=center| 7-6
| Renato Sobral
| Submission (armbar)
| Rings: King of Kings 2000 Block A
| 
| align=center| 1
| align=center| 2:58
| Tokyo, Japan
| 
|-
| Loss
| align=center| 7-5
| Gilbert Yvel
| Submission (armbar)
| Rings: King of Kings 1999 Block B
| 
| align=center| 1
| align=center| 2:18
| Osaka, Japan
| 
|-
| Win
| align=center| 7-4
| Joop Kasteel
| TKO
| Rings: Rings Georgia
| 
| align=center| 1
| align=center| 4:11
| Georgia
| 
|-
| Loss
| align=center| 6-4
| Joop Kasteel
| Submission (keylock)
| Rings: Rise 4th
| 
| align=center| 1
| align=center| 6:01
| Japan
| 
|-
| Loss
| align=center| 6-3
| Kiyoshi Tamura
| Submission (rear-naked choke)
| Rings: Rise 3rd
| 
| align=center| 1
| align=center| 9:19
| Japan
| 
|-
| Win
| align=center| 6-2
| Kiyoshi Tamura
| TKO
| Rings: Third Fighting Integration
| 
| align=center| 1
| align=center| 3:39
| Tokyo, Japan
| 
|-
| Loss
| align=center| 5-2
| Dick Vrij
| Submission (rear naked choke)
| Rings: Mega Battle Tournament 1997 Semifinal 1
| 
| align=center| 1
| align=center| 6:07
| Japan
| 
|-
| Win
| align=center| 5-1
| Yoshihisa Yamamoto
| N/A
| Rings: Budokan Hall 1997
| 
| align=center| 0
| align=center| 0:00
| Tokyo, Japan
| 
|-
| Win
| align=center| 4-1
| Yoshihisa Yamamoto
| N/A
| Rings: Battle Dimensions Tournament 1996 Final
| 
| align=center| 0
| align=center| 0:00
| 
| 
|-
| Loss
| align=center| 3-1
| Magomedkhan Gamzatkhanov
| N/A
| Rings: Battle Dimensions Tournament 1996 Final
| 
| align=center| 0
| align=center| 0:00
| 
| 
|-
| Win
| align=center| 3-0
| Hans Nijman
| N/A
| Rings: Battle Dimensions Tournament 1996 Final
| 
| align=center| 0
| align=center| 0:00
| 
| 
|-
| Win
| align=center| 2-0
| Nikolai Zouev
| N/A
| Rings: Battle Dimensions Tournament 1996 Opening Round
| 
| align=center| 0
| align=center| 0:00
| 
| 
|-
| Win
| align=center| 1-0
| Dimitre Petkov
| N/A
| Rings: Battle Dimensions Tournament 1995 Opening Round
| 
| align=center| 0
| align=center| 0:00
| 
|

References

External links
 
 Tariel Bitsadze at mixedmartialarts.com
 Tariel Bitsadze at fightmatrix.com

Male mixed martial artists from Georgia (country)
Heavyweight mixed martial artists
Super heavyweight mixed martial artists
Mixed martial artists utilizing Kyokushin kaikan
Living people
Male karateka from Georgia (country)
1966 births